Statistics of Bulgarian State Football Championship in the 1944 season.

Overview
It was contested by 26 teams. The championship was not finished. Besides teams from the present borders of Bulgaria, the 1944 season was the last season to involve teams from the areas under Bulgarian administration during much of World War II. Football clubs from Skopje in Vardar Macedonia and Kavala in Greek Macedonia took part in the competition.

First round

|}
1Orel-Chegan 30 Vratsa were originally qualified to the second round because Knyaz Simeon Tarnovski Pavlikeni were withdraw from the competition, but they were also withdraw.
2ZhSK Stara Zagora were qualified to the second round because Botev Yambol were withdraw from the competition.
3Bulgaria Haskovo were qualified to the second round because Momchil yunak Kavala were withdraw from the competition.

Second round

|}
1Shipchenski sokol Varna were qualified to the quarter-finals because Levski Dobrich were rejected participation in the replay match.

Quarter-finals

|}

References
Bulgaria - List of final tables (RSSSF)

Bulgarian State Football Championship seasons
1
1